Austin Godfrey Baxter (21 September 1931 – 17 January 1993) was an English first-class cricketer active 1952–53 who played for Nottinghamshire. He was born in West Bridgford; died in Lenton.

References

1931 births
1993 deaths
English cricketers
Nottinghamshire cricketers
People from West Bridgford
People from Lenton, Nottingham
Cricketers from Nottinghamshire